Nigeria competed at the 2000 Summer Paralympics, sending a 31-member strong delegation that won 13 medals, 7 of which were gold.

Team 
Nigeria sent a 31-member strong team, which included 11 women and 20 men.

Background 
In many parts of Black Africa, people who have disabilities that include insanity, and physical disabilities such as impairments and deformities often face cultural barriers to participation because of attitudes related to their disabilities.  These include beliefs that they acquired their disabilities because their parents were witches or they are wizards.  Their disability is often seen as a result of a personal failing on their part.  As such, there is often tremendous cultural pressure for people with physical disabilities to remain hidden and out of the public eye.  In many places, they are perceived to be monsters in need of healing.  This is the context to which Nigerian Paralympians engage both society and sport internally, in their own country.

Medals 
Nigeria won seven gold medals at the Sydney Games.  This was the most in the country's history after making their debut at the 1992 Summer Paralympics. The Nigerian Paralympic delegation left the Games having won more medals than their Olympic counterparts.

Athletics 
Nigerian athletes competed at the 1999 Disabled Sports USA DS/USA's National Summer Games as part of their preparation efforts for the 2000 Games.

Powerlifting 
Lucy Ejike competed in women's powerlifting.  These Games were the ones where she made her Paralympic debut.

Table tennis

See also
Nigeria at the 2000 Summer Olympics
Nigeria at the Paralympics

References

Bibliography

External links
International Paralympic Committee

Nations at the 2000 Summer Paralympics
Paralympics
2000